Future '38 is a 2017 American science fiction romantic comedy film written and directed by Jamie Greenberg.

Cast
Nick Westrate as Essex
Betty Gilpin as Banky
Tom Riis Farrell as Lamont Hitler
Robert John Burke as General Sportwood
Ethan Phillips as Dr. Elcourt
Sophie von Haselberg as Iota
Ilana Becker as Elke
Neil deGrasse Tyson
Sean Young as Mabel
Hillel Meltzer as Matzoh
Anthony DeVito as Bitter Herb
Michael Birch as Officer O'Reilly

Reception
The film has a 75% approval rating on Rotten Tomatoes, based on 12 reviews with an average score of 5.67/10.

References

External links
 
 
 

American science fiction films
American romantic comedy films
2010s English-language films
2010s American films